Alpheus Felch (September 28, 1804June 13, 1896) was the fifth governor of Michigan and U.S. Senator from Michigan.

Early life
Felch was born in Limerick (in modern-day Maine, then a part of Massachusetts). He was left an orphan at the age of three and lived with his grandfather Abijah Felch, a veteran of the American Revolutionary War. He attended the Phillips Exeter Academy in Exeter, New Hampshire, and graduated from Bowdoin College, Brunswick, Maine, in 1827. He studied law and was admitted to the bar in Bangor, Maine, and practiced in Houlton, Maine, from 1830 to 1833.

Political career
Felch moved to Monroe, Michigan, in 1833 and continued the practice of law. In 1835 he was the aid-de-camp to General Joseph Brown during the mustering of troops for the Ohio–Michigan Boundary Dispute (the Toledo War). He was elected three times to the Michigan State House of Representatives, serving from  1835 to 1837. He was appointed state bank commissioner in 1838 and resigned in 1839. As bank commissioner, he did much to expose frauds which had been made possible by a general wildcat banking law which he had opposed, and which was afterward declared unconstitutional by the Michigan Supreme Court. He was state auditor general for a few weeks in 1842 before being appointed associate justice of the Michigan Supreme Court in 1842, where he served until his resignation in 1845, after being elected governor. He served as Governor of Michigan from 1846 to 1847 and during those fourteen months, state statutes were amended and the state capital was relocated to Lansing.

Felch resigned as governor on March 3, 1847, after being elected by the Michigan legislature as a Democrat to the United States Senate. He served in the 30th, 31st and 32nd Congresses, from March 4, 1847 to March 3, 1853. In the U.S. Senate, he was chairman of the committee on public lands for four years.

In March 1853, he was appointed by U.S. President Franklin Pierce to the land claims commission for California to settle Spanish and Mexican land claims arising from the Treaty of Guadalupe Hidalgo which ended the Mexican–American War and served as president of the commission until 1856. He returned to live in Ann Arbor, Michigan, that year and made an unsuccessful attempt at a non-consecutive term as governor against the Republican incumbent Kinsley S. Bingham. He resumed his law career and served as the Tappan Professor of Law at the University of Michigan from 1879 to 1883.

Death and legacy

He died in Ann Arbor, Michigan, at the age of 91, and is there interred at Forest Hill Cemetery.

Alpheus Felch is the namesake of Felch Township, Michigan. Felch Park, on the University of Michigan campus, is also named for him.

References

External links
Portrait & Biographical Album 
The Political Graveyard
National Governors Association
 

1804 births
1896 deaths
Michigan Auditors General
Democratic Party governors of Michigan
Democratic Party members of the Michigan House of Representatives
Justices of the Michigan Supreme Court
Bowdoin College alumni
Phillips Exeter Academy alumni
Democratic Party United States senators from Michigan
University of Michigan faculty
Politicians from Ann Arbor, Michigan
People from Limerick, Maine
Politicians from Bangor, Maine
Methodists from Michigan
Regents of the University of Michigan
Burials in Michigan
Maine lawyers
19th-century American lawyers
19th-century American politicians
19th-century American judges